Georges Christian Lenglolo (28 July 1982 – 4 September 2021) was a Cameroonian professional footballer who played as a forward.

Honours
Persipura Jayapura
 Liga Indonesia Premier Division: 2005

Sriwijaya
 Liga Indonesia Premier Division: 2007–08

References

External links
Profile at liga-indonesia.co.id
Profile at mutiarahitam-jdo6

1982 births
2021 deaths
Cameroonian footballers
Association football forwards
Indonesian Premier Division players
Liga 1 (Indonesia) players
Cameroon under-20 international footballers
Jasper United F.C. players
Persipura Jayapura players
Persikota Tangerang players
Sriwijaya F.C. players
Persema Malang players
PSIR Rembang players
Persijap Jepara players
Cameroonian expatriate footballers
Cameroonian expatriate sportspeople in Indonesia
Expatriate footballers in Indonesia
Cameroonian expatriate sportspeople in Nigeria
Expatriate footballers in Nigeria
Footballers from Douala